Lord Asquith may refer to:

 H. H. Asquith, 1st Earl of Oxford and Asquith (1852–1928)
 Cyril Asquith, Baron Asquith of Bishopstone (1890–1954)
 Julian Asquith, 2nd Earl of Oxford and Asquith (1916–2011)
 Raymond Asquith, 3rd Earl of Oxford and Asquith (born 1952)